Demchok may refer to:

Places
 Demchok (historical village)
 Demchok, Ladakh
 Dêmqog, Ngari Prefecture
 Demchok sector

Religion
 Khorlo Demchok, Tibetan name of Cakrasaṃvara Tantra in Vajrayana Buddhism
 Demchok, the Buddhist Tantric deity of Khorlo Demchok

See also
 Demchuk, a Ukrainian surname
 Demchugdongrub, the leader of the Japanese puppet state of Mengjiang